Tourbières-de-Lanoraie Ecological Reserve is an ecological reserve in Quebec, Canada. It was established in 1994.

References

External links
 Official website from Government of Québec

Protected areas of Lanaudière
Nature reserves in Quebec
Protected areas established in 1994
1994 establishments in Quebec